The Iran Airports and Air Navigation Company (IAC) is the holding and operating company for civilian airports and managing the air navigation in Iran. Its headquarters are located at Tehran's Mehrabad International Airport and it has offices at all airports in Iran.

Former managing directors 

 Hassan Abedini 
 Hossein Akramiyan Arani
 Abbas Ariaei Pour
 Hossein Ghasemi
 Asghar Ketabchi (first time)
 Gholam Abbas Arasmesh
 Nourollah Rezaei Niaraki
 Mohammad Hassan Pasvar
 Asghar Ketabchi (second time)
 Seyed Ahmad Momeni Rokh
 Mohsen Esmaeili (2009–2012)
 Mahmoud Rasouli Nejad
 Esmaeil Tabadar
 Mohammad Ali Ilkhaani
 Rahmatolah Mahabadi
 Siavash AmirMokri
 Hamid Reza Seyedi (current)

Owned airports

International airports 
 Tehran Imam Khomeini International Airport
 Mehrabad International Airport
 Mashhad International Airport
 Isfahan International Airport
 Shiraz International Airport
 Tabriz International Airport
 Bandar Abbas International Airport
 Zahedan Airport
 Yazd Shahid Sadooghi Airport
 Ahvaz International Airport
 Ayatollah Hashemi Rafsanjani Airport

Air border airports 
 Arak Airport
 Ardabil Airport
 Urmia Airport
 Ilam Airport
 Bojnord Airport
 Bandar Lengeh Airport
 Birjand International Airport
 Khorramabad Airport
 Rasht Airport
 Rafsanjan Airport
 Zanjan Airport
 Sari Airport
 Sabzevar Airport
 Sanandaj Airport
 Shahrekord Airport
 Kermanshah Airport
 Gorgan Airport
 Larestan Airport
 Lamerd International Airport
 Hamadan International Airport
 Shahroud Airport
 Bushehr Airport
 Abadan International Airport

Domestic airports 
 Abu Musa Airport
 Iranshahr Airport
 Bam Airport
 Parsabad Airport
 Jahrom Airport
 Jiroft Airport
 Khoy Airport
 Darab Airport
 Ramsar International Airport
 Zabol Airport
 Zarghan Airport
 Saravan Airport
 Semnan Airport
 Sahand Airport
 Sirjan Airport
 Tabas Airport
 Fasa Airport
 Kalaleh Airport
 Noshahr Airport
 Yasuj Airport

See also
Iran Civil Aviation Organization
Transport in Iran
List of airports in Iran
List of the busiest airports in Iran
List of airlines of Iran

References

External links
 Ministry of Road and Urban Development Of Iran Official Website 
 Civil Aviation Organization of Iran 
Iran Airports Company Official website

Airport operators
Transport companies established in 1988
1988 establishments in Iran
Iran Airports company Managing Directors